Yollıg Khagan (Old Turkic: 𐰖𐰆𐰞𐰞𐰃𐰍:𐱅𐰃𐰏𐰤 Pronunciation: Yollıg Tigin,; 734–739?) was the fifth ruler of the Second Turkic Khaganate.

He was Bilge Khagan's son. Besides being author of Orkhon Inscriptions, nothing much is known about him. His wife Yusaifu left for Tang after 744.

References 

 
 

Göktürk khagans
Ashina house of the Turkic Empire
8th-century Turkic people
Tengrist monarchs